Kalevala Day (Finnish: Kalevalan päivä), known as Finnish Culture Day by its other official name, is celebrated each 28 February in honor of the Finnish national epic, Kalevala. The day is one of the official flag flying days in Finland.

Kalevala—the Finnish national epic

Kalevala is a 19th-century work of epic poetry compiled by Elias Lönnrot from Finnish and Karelian oral folklore and mythology. It is regarded as the national epic of Finland and Karelia and is one of the most significant works of Finnic literature. Kalevala has inspired artworks of many famous artists, including the music of Finnish classical composer Jean Sibelius and the illustrations of Finnish painter Akseli Gallen-Kallela.

The title, Kalevala, can be interpreted as The Land of Kaleva or Kalevia. The first version of Kalevala, called The Old Kalevala, was published in 1835. The second version, the most commonly known today, was first published in 1849. It consists of 22,795 verses divided into fifty poems/songs (Finnish: Runot).

The author of Kalevala, Elias Lönnrot (9 April 1802 – 19 March 1884), was a Finnish physician, philologist, and collector of traditional Finnic oral folklore. The material was gathered by him from Finnic oral tradition carried from the distant past, including short ballads, lyric poems, and mythology, during his several expeditions in Finland, Russian Karelia, the Kola Peninsula, and the Baltic countries.

The earliest remaining written reference to Kaleva (a.k.a. Kalev, Kalevi, etc. in Estonia) is by many experts considered to be one found in "Widsith", also known as The Traveller's Song, which also provides the earliest known written usage of the name Viking, with the spelling wicing. "Widsith" is a 6th- or 7th-century Anglo-Saxon poem—or song—of 143 lines, which became copied into the Exeter Book, a manuscript of Old English poetry compiled in the late 10th century. "Widsith" is for the most part a survey of the people, kings, and heroes of Europe in the Germanic Heroic Age.

The Germanic Heroic Age corresponds to the Germanic Wars in terms of historiography, and to the Germanic Iron Age in terms of archaeology, spanning the early centuries of the 1st millennium, in particular the 4th and 5th centuries, the period of the final collapse of the Western Roman Empire, and the establishment of stable "barbarian kingdoms" larger than the tribal level (the kingdoms of the Visigoths, the Franks, and the Burgundians, and the Anglo-Saxon invasion of Britain). The Germanic peoples at the time lived mostly in tribal societies.

The following is stated in "Widsith":

"Caesar ruled the Greeks, Caelic the Finns ... I was with the Greeks and Finns and also with Caesar ...". 

Many historians and folklorists believe "Widsith's" "Caelic" to be a reference to the ancient Finnic ruler "Kaleva/Kalevi", discussed in both the Finnish epic Kalevala and the Estonian epic Kalevipoeg.

Kalevipoeg—the Estonian national epic
Following the publishing of Kalevala, a similar Estonian national epic, Kalevipoeg, was completed in 1853. Due to censorship, it could not be published that year, but it became published in parts as a new and extended version during the years 1857–1861, and as a book in 1862. Kalevipoeg is based on ancient oral tradition within Ancient Estonia of legends explaining the origin of the world.

Within old Estonian folklore, a malevolent giant by the name of Kalevi—a.k.a. Kalev, Kalevine, Kalevipoiss, Kalevine posikine, Kalevin Poika—appears, battling with other giants or enemies of the nation. In addition to "Widsith's" Caelic, early written references to Kalevi are found in a list of deities published by Finnish author Mikael Agricola in 1551, with the spelling Calenanpoiat and in Leyen Spiegel, published by Heinrich Stahl in 1641, with the spelling Kalliweh. Kalevi—in slightly varying spellings—in the Estonian epic Kalevipoeg, is widely viewed to be the same hero as Kaleva in the Finnish and Karelian epic Kalevala.

References

European culture
Finnish culture
Public holidays in Finland
Finnish flag flying days
Kalevala